Ariel Lin Yi-chen (born 29 October 1982) is a Taiwanese actress and singer. She rose to fame for her role as Yuan Xiangqin in the Taiwanese drama It Started with a Kiss (2005) and the Chinese fantasy drama The Little Fairy (2006). Lin won Best Actress at the 43rd and 47th Golden Bell Awards for her roles in They Kiss Again (2007) and In Time with You (2011) respectively.

Career

2004: Beginnings
Lin was first discovered in a Taiwanese beauty contest. She made her debut in the television drama True Love 18 (2002). Lin also starred in her first film Love Me, If You Can (2004), which earned her a nomination for Best Actress at the 40th Golden Horse Awards. She gained more popularity after starring in the idol drama series My Secret Garden II and  Love Contract opposite Mike He. She also sang the theme song for Love Contract, titled "Alone in the northern hemisphere", which topped the KTV and ring tone charts for 12 weeks.

2005–2007: Breakthrough
Lin rose to mainstream popularity for her role as Yuan Xiangqin in the popular Taiwanese idol drama It Started with a Kiss (2005). The series topped ratings in Taiwan, and was a hit across Asia.

Lin then starred in her first Chinese drama, The Little Fairy (2006) where she played the Seventh Fairy Maiden. The series was extremely popular and had high ratings, marking her successful foray into the Chinese market. The same year, she starred in Tokyo Juliet alongside Wu Chun.

Lin reunited with Joe Cheng in They Kiss Again (2007), the sequel of It Started with a Kiss. The drama had an average rating of 3.43, becoming one of the highest rated idol dramas. Lin's performance in the drama won her the Best Actress award at the 43rd Golden Bell Awards, making her the first actress in history to win the award with an idol drama. The same year, she released the single "Adventure of Lunia"  as the theme song for the video game Lunia: Record of Lunia War.

2008–2013: Continued success and Singing career

Lin starred in the 2008 adaptation of Louis Cha's novel The Legend of the Condor Heroes. She plays Huang Rong, opposite her The Little Fairy co-star Hu Ge, who plays Guo Jing. She also starred in the Taiwanese drama Love or Bread, her third collaboration with Joe Cheng.

In 2009, Lin signed a three-year and three-album contract with Avex Taiwan. She released her first album, Blissful Encounter, which sold 20,000 copies within 2 days. The same year, she starred in her first theater play, The War and Peace between Men and Women.

Lin then starred in romance drama In Time with You (2011), co-starring Bolin Chen. It was the highest rated Taiwanese idol drama of the year and was extremely popular across Asia. Lin won her Golden Bell Award for Best Actress trophy for her performance in the series. She then starred alongside Feng Shaofeng in the historical drama Prince of Lan Ling (2013). In 2013, she was listed by Forbes as the 85th most influential celebrity in China.

2014–present: Films
Following her television career, Lin focused on films. In 2014, she starred in the crime caper Sweet Alibis alongside Alec Su. It was chosen as the Most Popular Taiwanese Film at the 6th Straits Film and Television Awards. Lin then starred in Go Lala Go 2 (2015), the sequel to the 2010 hit film Go Lala Go!. However unlike its predecessor, it was a critical and commercial flop.

Lin turned to the thriller genre in The Mysterious Family (2017), playing a rape victim who becomes psychologically scarred after the incident. The same year, she was cast in the television drama Old Boy alongside Liu Ye, marking her small-screen comeback after 4 years.

In 2018, Lin was cast in the historical drama I Will Never Let You Go as the protagonist.

Personal life 

Lin was born in Yilan, Taiwan to a middle-income family. She has a younger brother. Her parents separated when she was very young and divorced when she was in high school. (Lin helped reconcile them in 2014.) Lin was raised by her mother and lived in poverty for many years. She began taking care of the family in her second year of high school after her mother suffered a cerebellar stroke. At age 18, she entered a beauty competition because she wanted to win the prize money and buy her brother a new computer. She won first place. She was also accepted to National Chengchi University, a top university in Taiwan. She graduated with a BA in Korean literature while working as an actress part-time. When she filmed in China, several of her classmates copied notes for her. 

Lin is severely myopic (-7.0D) and wears contact lenses. In June 2008, Lin was diagnosed with a 2 cm cyst on her pituitary gland, following which she had an operation in February 2009. 

In 2013, she decided to take a break from her career. She went to United Kingdom and obtained a Master of Arts (MA) in Acting for Screen from the Royal Central School of Speech and Drama, University of London in 2014.

On 24 December 2014, Lin married businessman Charles Lin. The couple were introduced by mutual friends. On 29 September 2021, Lin announced her pregnancy hours after media broke the news. She gave birth to a girl on 18 October that year. She wrote a book during her pregnancy, which topped Books.com.tw's bestseller lists (both print and e-book) when it was published in January 2022.

Filmography

Film

Television series

Theater

Discography

Studio albums

Singles

Music video
 2001:
 Believe - 相信 (May day - 五月天) 2001
 Lonely Flight - 寂寞飛行 (Maggie Chiang - 江美琪) 2001
 Nunchuks - 雙截棍 (Jay Chow 周杰倫) 2001
 Paper Flight - 紙飛機 (Sandy Lam - 林憶蓮) 2001
 2002:
 MAKE A WISH (Vic Chou - 周渝民) 2002
 Love Guardian 鎮守愛情 (Power Staton - 動力火車) 2002
 Angel (David Tao - 陶吉吉) 2002
 2003:
 Friends 名扬四海 - Rainbow (You Chiu-Hsing 尤秋興 of Power Station 動力火車) 2003
 She's having my baby (Tension) 2003
 2004:
 Secret Garden II 我的秘密花園 II - 單純的臉孔 (Zhang Jian) 2004 
 Cha Cha (Secret Garden II OST - 我的秘密花園 II 電視原聲帶) (Ariel Lin - 林依晨, Cheryl Yang - 楊謹華, Yolin Liang - 梁又琳, Michelle Lin - 林立雯, Marcus - 張天霖 và Daniel Lee - 李岳) 2004 
 Love Contract 愛情合約原聲帶-孤單北半球 2004 (Ariel Lin - 林依晨) 2004
 Love Contract 愛情合約原聲帶-中間 (Fish Leong - 梁静茹) 2004
 Love Contract 愛情合約原聲帶 - Shinning (丸子) 2004
 Love Contract 愛情合約原聲帶 - 失去 (A-Yue 張震嶽) 2004
 Love Contract 愛情合約原聲帶 - 關於我們之間的事 (A-Yue 張震嶽) 2004
 Love Contract 愛情合約原聲帶 - 中間（鋼琴版）(潘協慶) 2004
 孤單北半球 (Ariel Lin - 林依晨) 2004
 Waiting for You - 字幕歌词 (Asnon Hu - 胡彦斌) (Love Contract MV) 2004 
 白月光 (Jeff Chang - 张信哲) 2004 (Ariel Lin dub Korean for the girl in the MV)
 2005:
 It Started with a Kiss 惡作劇之吻 - Say you love me (Jason & 温岚) 2005
 It Started with a Kiss 惡作劇之吻 - Meet 遇到 (方雅賢) 2005
 It Started with a Kiss 惡作劇之吻 - Come A Little Closer 靠近一點點 (梁心頤)
 It Started with a Kiss 惡作劇之吻 - Can We 能不能 (Jason Wang 王威登 & Lady Wen 溫嵐) 2005
 It Started with a Kiss 惡作劇之吻 - The Whole World Could Hear 全世界的人都知道 (王俞勻) 2005
 It Started with a Kiss 惡作劇之吻 - Regret 後悔 (何書宇) 2005
 It Started with a Kiss 惡作劇之吻 - 惡作劇 (王藍茵) 2005
 Born in A Troubled Time - 亂世浮生 (May day - 五月天) 2005
 惡作劇 (王藍茵) 2005
 2006:
 The Little Fairy 天外飛仙 - 一眼萬年 (S.H.E) 2006 
 The Little Fairy 天外飛仙 - 千年淚 (Tank) 2006
 The Little Fairy 天外飛仙 - 天亮以後 (Hu Ge - 胡歌) 2006
 The Little Fairy 天外飛仙 - 古靈精怪 (吳艾倫 & 林靜) 2006
 The Little Fairy 天外飛仙 - 月光 (Hu Ge - 胡歌) 2006
 The Little Fairy 天外飛仙 - 棋只 2006
 Tokyo Juliet 東方茱麗葉 - 逆風 (花園精靈) 2006
 Tokyo Juliet 東方茱麗葉 - It Had To Be You 非你莫屬 (Ariel Lin - 林依晨) 2006
 Good friend - 好朋友 (Alan Luo - 羅志祥) 2006
 2007:
 Angel Wings - 天使的翅膀 (published in Beatrice Hsu 2007 Light Concert by Xu Zhiwei - 许志玮, Ariel Lin - 林依晨, Joe Cheng - 郑元畅, Rainie Yang - 杨丞琳, Mike He - 贺军翔, Cyndi Wang - 王心凌, Phoebe Huang - 黄嘉千, Wallace Huo - 霍建华, David Chen - 陈宇凡, Penny Lin - 林韦君, Eli Shih - 施易男, Van Fan - 范逸臣, Cheryl Yang - 杨谨华, Victor Wong - 品冠, Alien Huang - 黃鴻升, Ben Pai - 白吉胜,... ) 2007
 Adventure of Lunia - 路尼亞戰記 (Ariel Lin - 林依晨) 2007
 They Kiss Again 惡作劇2吻 - 幸福合作社 (Mavis Fan - 范曉萱) 2007
 They Kiss Again 惡作劇2吻 - 你 (Ariel Lin - 林依晨) 2007
 2008:
 Beating Heart 跳动的心 (Justin Lo - 側田) 2008
 Love or Bread 我的億萬麵包 - 歐兜水 (Huang Wen-hsing - 黃文星) 2008

TV Commercial
 2001:
 TrainAsia 2U PrePaidCard (2001)
 TrainAsia 2U PrePaidCard CDbox (2001)
 TrainAsia 2U PrePaidCard KTV (2001)
 2003: 
 Jcode CF Meetings (2003) (Ariel Lin and Dyla Kuo)
 Xin Gui Bai Strawberry Biscuit CF 1 (2003) (Ariel Lin and Bryant Chang)
 Jcode CF Restaurant (2003) (Ariel Lin and Dyla Kuo)
 Xin Gui Bai Strawberry Biscuit CF 2 (2003)(Ariel Lin and Bryant Chang)
 Jcode CF Ghost House (2003) (Ariel Lin and Dyla Kuo)
 Xin Gui Bai Strawberry Biscuit CF 2 (2003)
 2004:
 Jcode CF Valentines (2/2004) (Ariel Lin and Dyla Kuo)
 Jcode CF Motorcycle (2004)
 Contact Lens Solution CF (2004)
 2005:
 Jcode CF Reminder (2/2005) (Ariel Lin and Mike He)
 Jcode CF Love (8/2005) (Ariel Lin and Mike He)
 Heme CF Romeo Juliet (12/2005) (Ariel Lin and Vic Chou)
 2006:
 Jcode CF Love (1/2006) (Ariel Lin and Mike He)
 Jcode CF Slow Dance (2/2006) (Ariel Lin and Mike He)
 Sofy CF Puzzle (4/2006)
 Heme CF Romeo Juliet (5/2006) (Ariel Lin and Vic Chou)
 Green Tea CF Shopping (5/2006)
 Sofy CF Sleep In (9/2006)
 Green Tea CF Field (10/2006)
 Heme Commercial (11/2006)
 Heme CF Red Dress (11/2006)
 2007:
 Heme CF Whack a Mole (1/2007)
 711 Snoopy CF 1 (1/2007)
 711 Snoopy CF Search (1/2007)
 711 Snoopy CF Camera 1 (2/2007)
 711 Snoopy CF Camera 2 (2/2007)
 Sofy CF Good Night Rest (2/2007)
 Qqueen CF (5/2007)
 711 Snoopy CF Baseball (7/2007)

Bibliography

Awards and nominations

References

External links

   Ariel Lin's official website
 
Ariel Lin at hkmdb.com
Ariel Lin at chinesemov.com

1982 births
Living people
Taiwanese television actresses
Taiwanese film actresses
Taiwanese Mandopop singers
Actresses from Taipei
Musicians from Taipei
National Chengchi University alumni
People from Yilan County, Taiwan
Taiwanese idols
21st-century Taiwanese singers
21st-century Taiwanese actresses
21st-century Taiwanese women singers
Participants in Chinese reality television series
Reality show winners